Friendship Heights Village is an urbanized, unincorporated area in Montgomery County, Maryland, United States. Friendship Heights Village is distinct from the Washington, D.C. neighborhood of Friendship Heights). The population was 5,360 at the 2020 census.

Geography
Friendship Heights Village is located at  (38.962510, −77.090181).

Demographics

As of the 2020 census, there were 5,360 people, 2,804 households, and 1,003 families residing in the area. The population density was 90,848/square mile: this is the highest population density of any incorporated or census-designated place in the United States. 

The racial makeup of the area was 67.2% White (alone, non-Hispanic), 4.7% African American, 1.9% Native American, 11.2% Asian, 1.1% other race, and Hispanic or Latino making up 13.9% of the Village's population.

In the area, the population was spread out, with 5.5% under the age of 5, 9.8% under the age of 18, and 32.5% are 65 years or older. The Village is composed of 60% women, 28% of all residents are foreign born, and 98% are high school grads, while 88% graduated from college.

The median income for a household in the area was $106,771, with the per capita income equaling $91,197.

Village of Friendship Heights

Although not an incorporated municipality, the Village of Friendship Heights was established as a Special Tax District in 1914. Its boundaries—Wisconsin Avenue, Willard Avenue, and Somerset Terrace—enclose 34 acres (140,000 m2) and is almost entirely occupied by high-rise residential buildings. It has the highest population density of any census-designated place or city in the United States. In fact, its density exceeds that of the New York City borough of Manhattan, which itself is coextensive with the United States' most dense county. The 2010 population of Friendship Village Heights was 4,698, giving it a population density of 88,432 per square mile, versus Manhattan's approximate 70,000.

Buildings:
 Highland House Apartments - 5480 Wisconsin Avenue
 Highland House West Apartments - 4450 S. Park Avenue
 The Willoughby Condominium - 4515 Willard Avenue
 The Carleton Condominium - 4550 N. Park Avenue
 Office Building - 5550 Friendship Blvd.
 The Elizabeth Condominium - 4601 N. Park Avenue
 4615 North Park Apartments
 Police Field Office - 4602 N. Park Avenue
 4620 N. Park Avenue Condominium
 Willard Towers - 4701 Willard Avenue
 Sunrise Brighton Gardens (Assisted Living Residence) - 5555 Friendship Blvd.
 Friendship Heights Village Center - 4433 S. Park Avenue
 Chevy Chase Office Building - 5530 Wisconsin Avenue
 Courtyard by Marriott Chevy Chase - 5520 Wisconsin Avenue
 Barlow Office Building - 5454 Wisconsin Avenue
 Chase Tower Office and Retail Building - 4445 Willard Avenue

The Village is governed by a seven-member village council, which includes the mayor; each member is elected to a two-year term.

The Village provides numerous services for its citizens, such as the following:

 Shuttle bus which circles the neighborhood, making stops at the major residential buildings, the Friendship Heights Village Center, nearby shopping centers, and the Friendship Heights stop of the Washington Metro.
 MVA on Wheels
 Visiting Nurse
 Permit Applications
 Police Field Office
 Mobile Commuter Store
 Shredding Truck
 Farmers' Market

The Village also offer a wide variety of activities and events at its Village Center, such as classes, trainings, concerts, and programs on demand, just to name a few. Every year, the Village also hosts three large events for its residents: April 13 - Community Day to celebrate the Village's founding; July 4 - Independence Day Celebration; and mid-October - Fall festival.

See also

List of United States cities by population density

References

External links

 Village of Friendship Heights

 
1914 establishments in Maryland
Census-designated places in Maryland
Census-designated places in Montgomery County, Maryland
Populated places established in 1914
Suburbs of Washington, D.C.
Washington metropolitan area